The men's 110 metres hurdles event at the 2008 World Junior Championships in Athletics was held in Bydgoszcz, Poland, at Zawisza Stadium on 11, 12 and 13 July.  99.0 cm (3'3) (junior implement) hurdles were used.

Medalists

Results

Final
13 July
Wind: +1.1 m/s

Semifinals
12 July

Semifinal 1
Wind: -0.9 m/s

Semifinal 2
Wind: -1.7 m/s

Semifinal 3
Wind: -1.0 m/s

Heats
11 July

Heat 1
Wind: -2.0 m/s

Heat 2
Wind: -0.7 m/s

Heat 3
Wind: -0.6 m/s

Heat 4
Wind: -1.7 m/s

Heat 5
Wind: -1.4 m/s

Heat 6
Wind: -1.3 m/s

Heat 7
Wind: -1.0 m/s

Heat 8
Wind: -0.7 m/s

Participation
According to an unofficial count, 65 athletes from 45 countries participated in the event.

References

110 metres hurdles
Sprint hurdles at the World Athletics U20 Championships